The  Royal Watercolour Society of Wales is an association of watercolor artists in Wales founded in 1959.

History

The Watercolour Society of Wales was founded in 1959 by six artists in the Cardiff area.
The society's first exhibition was held that year at the National Museum Cardiff.
At first the members were from the Cardiff area, but in the 1970s and 1980s the society drew in artists from all parts of Wales.
Charles, Prince of Wales became a patron of the society on 21 April 2007.
He  occasionally participates in exhibitions.
On 21 October 2013 it was officially announced that Queen Elizabeth II had approved addition of the prefix "Royal" to the society's name. 
By that time its membership consisted of about forty professional artists who lived and worked in Wales.

Activities

New members are elected to the society in an effort to maintain high standards.
In 2015 the painter and printmaker Robert Macdonald became the first elected Chair of the society.
The society gives its members opportunities to exhibit in respected galleries.
It holds two exhibitions annually showing life and landscape of Wales in various locations in Wales.
At these exhibitions the artists show work that explores innovative materials, techniques and perspectives.
Members have experimented with modern water-soluble media such as acrylics and gouache.
Subjects range from fluid seascapes to geometric depictions of industrial objects.

Notes

Sources

Arts organisations based in Wales
1959 establishments in Wales
Watercolor societies
Arts organizations established in 1959